William David Mungo James Murray, 8th Earl of Mansfield, 7th Earl of Mansfield,  (7 July 1930 – 21 October 2015), styled Lord Scone until 1970, was a British nobleman and Conservative politician.

Biography
William Murray was born on 7 July 1930. He was the only son of Mungo Murray, 7th Earl of Mansfield and Mansfield, and his wife Dorothea Helena, younger daughter of Sir Lancelot Carnegie. He was educated at Eton College and Christ Church, Oxford. He served with the Scots Guards in Malaya from 1949 to 1950. He was called to the bar, Inner Temple, in 1958.

Murray was a barrister from 1958 until 1971, when he succeeded his father as Earl of Mansfield.

He was a member of the British Delegation to the European Parliament from 1973 to 1975 (prior to the direct election of Members of the European Parliament), and was an opposition spokesman in the House of Lords from 1975 to 1979. He was a Minister of State in the Scottish Office from 1979 to 1983 and in the Northern Ireland Office from 1983 to 1984.

He was appointed an Honorary Sheriff of Perthshire in 1974, a Justice of the Peace in 1975 and a Deputy Lieutenant for Perth and Kinross in 1980.

Murray has also held a number of business and charitable appointments, such as serving as first president of the Federation of Hunting Associations of the European Communities (FACE) from 1977 to 1979.

He was the first President of the Scottish Association for the Care and Resettlement of Offenders and from 1985 to 1996 served as First Crown Estate Commissioner.

He succeeded as the 11th Lord Balvaird on 2 September 1971 and he succeeded as the 13th Lord Scone on 2 September 1971. He was also the feudal Baron of Balvaird.

Marriage and children
Murray married Pamela Joan Foster on 19 December 1955.  They had three children:

 Alexander David Mungo Murray, 9th Earl of Mansfield and Mansfield (born 17 October 1956)
 Lady Georgina Dorothea Mary Murray (born 10 March 1967)
 Hon James William Murray (born 7 June 1969)
The Countess was a Patroness of the Royal Caledonian Ball. She died on 2 October 2022, at the age of 87.

Death
Murray died on 21 October 2015 and his funeral and memorial service were held at St John's Kirk of Perth on 30 October 2015, with a wake at Scone Palace. He was succeeded by his son Alexander David Mungo Murray.

Ancestry

References

External links

thepeerage.com

1930 births
2015 deaths
People educated at Eton College
Alumni of Christ Church, Oxford
8
Members of the Inner Temple
Diplomatic peers
William
Scots Guards officers
Conservative Party (UK) MEPs
MEPs for the United Kingdom 1973–1979
Deputy Lieutenants in Scotland
Dunbar, William Murray, 8th Earl of
People associated with Perth and Kinross
Northern Ireland Office junior ministers
Scottish sheriffs
Mansfield